The Euskotren 200 series is an electric multiple unit (EMU) train type operated by Euskotren in the Basque Country, Spain from 1986 to 2018.

History
The trains were ordered by Euskotren in 1983, with the first unit being delivered in 1985. They entered service on 1 February 1986, originally in the Bilbao-Plentzia line, where they replaced the rolling stock inherited from FTS. The trains had been intended for use in the Bilbao metro (which took over most of the Bilbao-Plentzia railway), but ultimately new trains were built for it.  Thus, with the opening of the metro in 1995, the trains were transferred to the Txorierri, Urdaibai and Bilbao-San Sebastián lines. The trains were built entirely in the Basque Country: the motor cars by CAF in Beasain, the non-powered cars by Babcock & Wilcox in Sestao and the electrical equipment by Westingouse in Erandio.

The 20 trains originally consisted of 3 cars each. In 1996, 10 of them had a fourth car added, with the tree-car trains being used together with the 3500 series in the Urdaibai and Bilbao-San Sebastián lines. The remaining three-car trains had a fourth car added starting in 1999. All the new cars were built by CAF.

The 900 series, intended as a replacement of the 200 series, entered service in 2011. Starting in late 2017, the last 200 series units were retired from active service, with the trains being put up for auction in January 2018. On 24 November 2018, the last remaining unit was retired after a farewell trip, the train was then sent to the Basque Railway Museum for preservation.

Formations

Originally, each trainset was formed by two motored cars and two non-powered cars. Between 1996 and 2000 all units had a fourth (non-powered) car added.

See also
 Euskotren rolling stock

References

External links
 

Electric multiple units of Spain
200 series
CAF multiple units
Train-related introductions in 1986
1500 V DC multiple units